William Ewing may refer to:

 William Lee D. Ewing (1795–1846), U.S. Senator from Illinois
 William Maurice Ewing (1906–1974), American geophysicist and oceanographer
 Buck Ewing (William Ewing, 1859–1906), American baseball player
 Buck Ewing (1920s catcher) (William Monroe Ewing, 1903–1979), American baseball player
 William L. Ewing (1843–1905), U.S. politician
 William H. Ewing (1841–1924), American physician and politician in the Virginia House of Delegates 
 Rev. William Ewing, author of the 1910 Temple Dictionary of the Bible; see List of Bible dictionaries
 Bill Ewing, American director and producer

See also 
 Bill Ewing (footballer) (1909–1994), Australian rules footballer
 William Euing (1788–1874), Scottish philanthropist
 William Ewing Kemp, mayor of Kansas City, Missouri
 William Ewin (disambiguation)